"The Road I'm On" is a song by American rock band 3 Doors Down. It was released on March 17, 2003, as the second single from their second studio album, Away from the Sun (2002). The song reached number eight on the US Billboard Mainstream Rock Tracks chart and number 24 on the Billboard Modern Rock Tracks chart.

Music video
The music video was directed by the Malloys and shows the band performing on a checker-flag pattern stage at night. NASCAR drivers Tony Stewart and Dale Earnhardt Jr. are shown racing through the streets in custom Chevrolet Tahoes. Both drivers eventually end up on a local short track where a race is underway. The scorekeeping girl begins to name them on the chart. The two eventually bust out of the track and go back to the streets.

Charts

References

2003 singles
3 Doors Down songs
Song recordings produced by Rick Parashar
2003 songs
Republic Records singles
Songs written by Brad Arnold
Songs written by Todd Harrell
Songs written by Chris Henderson (American musician)
Songs written by Matt Roberts (musician)
Songs about loneliness
Songs about depression